Love Songs is a 2007 French musical film directed by Christophe Honoré, starring Louis Garrel, Ludivine Sagnier, Clotilde Hesme and Chiara Mastroianni. It was one of the 20 films selected for the main competition at the 2007 Cannes Film Festival.

Plot
The film is divided into three parts: The Departure, The Absence and The Return.

The Departure 
The film begins with Julie Pommeraye walking the streets of Paris; she goes to a cinema and from the tickets queue calls her boyfriend Ismaël Bénoliel on her cell phone. He is at work with Alice, but when Julie asks him he lies and says he is alone. Julie responds that he pisses her off. Later that night, Ismaël runs into Julie on his way home. They discuss Julie's frustrations about their relationship and eventually, already in their apartment, reconcile. Shortly afterwards Alice arrives; they all get into bed together, read a different book each and fight about each one's place in bed.

The next day Julie and Ismaël have breakfast with Julie's family; Julie gets frustrated and leaves for the kitchen, followed by her older sister, Jeanne. Julie tells Jeanne and later her mother about Alice and the threesome. In the night, after Ismaël, Julie and Alice leave a bar where they were eating, Julie starts complaining about Ismaël's relationship with Alice; Ismaël responds that her jealousy is ironic considering she also has a sexual relationship with Alice, but that she is truly the only one he loves. Alice tells them that she is only there to bring them together. They go to a concert where Alice befriends a guy named Gwendal. Julie starts feeling bad, so she and Ismaël decide to leave. Outside, Julie collapses and suddenly dies.

The Absence 
Going to work, Ismaël runs into Jeanne on her way to his and Julie's apartment. At work, he confronts Alice about his constant breakdowns since Julie's death and she comforts him. Since Jeanne is staying in Ismaël's apartment, he doesn't want to spend the night there, so Alice takes him to Gwendal's apartment.

Ismaël spends the entire night awake; in the morning he meets Erwann, Gwendal's younger brother who also lives there, and who before leaving for school offers Ismaël his room so he can finally get some sleep. Erwann returns and wakes Ismaël up, who borrows some clean clothes from Erwann and leaves for work. Later that night, he discovers Erwann has been following him. Erwann asks to go home with Ismaël, who rejects him. Ismaël gets to his apartment to find Jeanne still there, so he goes to Erwann's apartment to spend the night again.

The next day, Ismaël visits Julie's family. Later, upset over Julie, he spends the night with a bartender called Maud. Jeanne discovers the two of them in the apartment the next morning, but Ismaël dresses quickly and sneaks out as Jeanne and Maud chat.

The Return 
Ismaël goes to work to find Erwann waiting for him; he tells Erwann that he is flattered by his attention but is neither interested nor in need of him. Alice, having broken up with Gwendal, thinks Erwan had been sent by his brother to pick up the set of keys she had; she gives them to Ismaël to pass them on to Erwann. Leaving work, Ismaël finds Erwann waiting for him again. He returns the keys but then takes them back, and the two of them go to Ismaël's apartment.

Meanwhile, Alice receives a phone call from Julie's mother and the two of them meet at a restaurant, where Julie's mother asks her to take care of Ismaël. Jasmine, Julie's other sister, comes to tell her mother that her father is upset that she is still out so late at night, so she leaves. Alice and Jasmine briefly discuss their grief.

Ismaël and Erwann sleep together that night. Jeanne lets herself into Ismaël's apartment, discovers Erwann there, and leaves. He follows her into the street where they walk and she explains that she is trying to understand his process of grief, and admits his disinterest in children and threesome arrangement with Julie and Alice can finally be explained by his homosexuality. He neither confirms nor denies this, and the two part unreconciled and upset.

Erwann goes to Ismaël's office only to find Alice. He confirms that he and Ismaël are in the midst of a fling he hopes will develop further. Meanwhile, Ismaël, upset, visits Julie's grave and battles with his guilt over both not visiting sooner and his many sexual exploits since her death as a means of coping. Alice eventually finds him drunk at a bar and takes him to Erwann's, who invites him to stay. Ismaël explains that he will continue their affair as long as Erwann is comfortable not hearing that Ismaël loves him, and Erwann says Ismaël can stay as long as he is okay hearing he is loved. On the roof, Ismaël tells Erwann to "love him less but love him for a long time" and they kiss as Alice looks on from below.

References to Jacques Demy's work 
This film refers to many other cinematographic works but the most obvious one is to Jacques Demy's film The Umbrellas of Cherbourg and, more widely, to Demy's work.

The Umbrellas of Cherbourg 

 
The layout of both films is divided into three parts: The Departure, The Absence, and The Return. Furthermore, as a nod to the French actress Catherine Deneuve (the main character of The Umbrellas of Cherbourg), her daughter, Chiara Mastroianni, performs in the role of Julie's sister. They two have a scene where they wear the Epiphany crown, being filmed the same way.

Other films 
This film is also in tribute to The Young Girls of Rochefort as some sailors appear unexpectedly in a street in Paris, and to Lola and A Room in Town, two other musical films of Jacques Demy, because Julie's last name (Pommeraye) is also the name of The Passage Pommeraye of Nantes, seen in these films.

Cast
Louis Garrel as Ismaël Bénoliel
Ludivine Sagnier as Julie Pommeraye
Clotilde Hesme as Alice
Grégoire Leprince-Ringuet as Erwann
Chiara Mastroianni as Jeanne, Julie's older sister
Brigitte Roüan as Julie's mother
Alice Butaud as Jasmine, Julie's sister
Jean-Marie Winling as Julie's father
Yannick Renier as Gwendal, Erwann's brother
Esteban Carvajal-Alegria as Erwann's friend
Annabelle Hettmann as Maude, bar server

Box office
The film grossed a total of $2,966,934 worldwide—$104,567 in the United States and Canada and $2,862,367 in other territories.

Accolades

References

Reviews

External links
 Official site at ifcfilms.com
 
 
 
 
 

2007 films
2007 LGBT-related films
2000s musical films
Bisexuality-related films
Films directed by Christophe Honoré
Films produced by Paulo Branco
Films set in Paris
2000s French-language films
French LGBT-related films
French musical films
Lesbian-related films
LGBT-related musical films
2000s French films